Dobby may refer to:

People 
 Dobby Dobson (1942–2020), Jamaican reggae singer and record producer
 Dobby Gibson (born 1970), American poet
 Dobby Walker (1919–2009), American labor lawyer
 Dobby (musician), an Australian Aboriginal musician
 Anton Khudobin (born 1986), Russian goaltender of the Dallas Stars

Textiles
 Dobby loom, a mechanical device that simplifies the weaving of intricate patterns
 Dobby (cloth), fabric made on the loom

Other uses
 Dobby (Harry Potter), a character in the Harry Potter franchise
 Dobby, a character in the Peep Show TV series
 Dobby, a type of mischievous hobgoblin in English folklore

See also
 Dobie (disambiguation)
 Dobbie, a surname of Scottish origin